Hastings is an area in Pearland, Texas, United States that was formerly a distinct unincorporated area in Brazoria County.

Education
Alvin Independent School District operates schools in the area.

External links

Pearland, Texas